North Palm Beach is an incorporated village in Palm Beach County, Florida, United States. It is part of the Miami Metropolitan Area. The population was 13,162 at the 2020 census. The village won an award from the National Association of Home Builders as best planned community of 1956. The North Palm Beach Country Club is home to a Jack Nicklaus Signature golf course.

History

In 1954 for $5.5 million John D. MacArthur bought  of land in northern Palm Beach County that had been owned originally by Harry Seymour Kelsey and later by Sir Harry Oakes. The land included most of today's North Palm Beach as well as Lake Park, Palm Beach Gardens and Palm Beach Shores. MacArthur then began developing what is now North Palm Beach, which sat on former mangrove swamps and farm land. The area was punctuated only by Monet Road and Johnson Dairy Road to the north and south and US 1 and Prosperity Farms Road to the east and west.

Full-scale development and incorporation as a village occurred nearly simultaneously in 1956, with extensive dredging creating waterfront cul-de-sacs, and the development of a new east-west artery, Lighthouse Drive, connecting Old Dixie Highway and the newly aligned US 1.  US 1 was widened and became the main office and civic corridor. Sir Harry Oakes' castle-like home on US 1 became the clubhouse for the North Palm Beach Country Club, which is located on the village island surrounded by the Intracoastal Waterway reached by three bridges Lighthouse Drive bridge to the West, the Earmon River bridge to the south, and the Parker drawbridge to the north.

In 1960–1961, North Palm Beach elected Walter E. Thomas, Jr. as its fourth Mayor. Walter and his wife Jackie and four children (Ted, Larry, Jim, and Pam) were the 55th family to move into the Village, arriving in 1957.

Lake Park West Road was also extended from Old Dixie Highway to US 1 and was renamed Northlake Boulevard, becoming the village's main commercial corridor.

The North Palm Beach Country Club is publicly owned by the Village of North Palm Beach and is open to the general public seven days a week. It first opened in 1963. The aging original structure was demolished in 2018 and a new clubhouse was built in its place in 2019.

Geography

Demographics

2020 census

As of the 2020 United States census, there were 13,162 people, 6,254 households, and 3,539 families residing in the village.

2010 census

As of the census of 2010, there were 7,710 households, out of which 21.0% were vacant. In 2000, 15.3% had children under the age of 18 living with them, 42.1% were married couples living together, 6.9% had a female householder with no husband present, and 47.9% were non-families. 39.2% of all households were made up of individuals, and 18.3% had someone living alone who was 65 years of age or older. The average household size was 1.97 and the average family size was 2.63.

In 2000, the population was spread out, with 14.0% under the age of 18, 3.9% from 18 to 24, 24.2% from 25 to 44, 26.8% from 45 to 64, and 30.8% who were 65 years of age or older. The median age was 50.4 years. For every 100 females, there were 94.7 males. For every 100 females age 18 and over, there were 92.1 males.

In 2000, the median income for a household in the village was $60,738, and the median income for a family was $82,713. Males had a median income of $53,061 versus $34,024 for females. The per capita income for the village was $45,524.

As of 2000, speakers of English as a first language accounted for 92.78% of all residents, while Spanish consisted of 3.91%, French was at 1.32%, German made up 0.92%, Italian 0.66%, and Greek was the mother tongue of 0.39% of the population.

Landmarks

Florida Power & Light Office (contains a historical museum)
 John D. MacArthur Beach State Park is located nearby.
Parker Bridge

Libraries

The North Palm Beach Library services the village.  The village library opened on Saturday, October 4, 1969, at 303 Anchorage Drive. The North Palm Beach Public Library provides programs throughout the year including; story-time, author lectures, genealogy group meetings, book club discussions and other special events.

Notable people

 Jeff Atwater, Chief Financial Officer of Florida
 Gardner Dickinson, PGA golfer
 Mike Douglas, Famous American entertainer
 Ryan Klesko, Retired Major League Baseball first baseman
 Tom Lewis, U.S. Representative (1983–1995)
 Jack Nicklaus, Golfer and course architect
 Elin Nordegren, Swedish former model and the ex-wife of golfer Tiger Woods
 Sir Harry Oakes, early developer of the area
 Chris Cline, Coal mining billionaire – Regarded by Bloomberg as New King Coal
 Larry Ellison, co-founder of Oracle Corporation
 Stanley Druckenmiller, investor, hedge fund manager, former portfolio manager for George Soros

References

External links

 Village of North Palm Beach Official website

Villages in Palm Beach County, Florida
Villages in Florida
Populated coastal places in Florida on the Atlantic Ocean